Vicente Luis Mora (Córdoba, 1970) is a Spanish writer, poet, essayist and literary critic.

He received several prizes for his literary works. Collaborates in magazines such as Animal sospechoso, Archipielago, Clarin, El invisible anillo, Mercurio or Quimera, as well as in the Cuadernos del Sur supplement of Diario Córdoba. Co-directs the essay collection of Berenice Editorial and organizes the Poetic Map that is celebrated annually in Córdoba. He is included in many poetry and narrative anthologies.

In 2007 he was appointed director of the Instituto Cervantes in Albuquerque (New Mexico, US).

Works 
Poetry
Texto refundido de la ley del sueño (Rewritten text of the law of dreams), 1999. .
Mester de Cibervía (Ministry of Cybertrack), 2000. .
Nova (Nova), 2003. .
Autobiografía (novela de terror) (Autobiography (horror novel)), 2003. 
Construcción (Construction), 2005. .

Stories
Circular 07. Las afueras. (Circular 07: The Outskirts), 2007.
Circular. 2003ISBN 84-932945-0-0.
Subterráneos (Subterraneans), 2006 .

Essays
Pasadizos. Espacios simbólicos entre arte y literatura (Passages: Symbolic Spaces Between Art and Literature). 2008 .
La luz nueva. Singularidades en la narrativa española actual (The New Light: Singularities In Contemporary Spanish Narrative). 2007 .
Singularidades: ética y poética de la literatura española actual (Singularities: Ethics and Poetics of Contemporary Spanish Literature), 2006 .
Pangea: Internet, blogs y comunicación en un mundo nuevo (Pangea: Internet, Blogs and Communication In A New World). 2006 .

External links
 Vicente Luis Mora's official website
 Diario de Lecturas, the author's blog.
 Entrevista a Vicente Luis Mora por Alba Cromm, en Canal-L, Barcelona
 Poetry by Vicente Luis Mora in New Poetry in Translation

20th-century Spanish poets
Spanish literary critics
Spanish essayists
1970 births
People from Córdoba, Spain
Living people
Spanish male poets
Male essayists
21st-century Spanish poets
20th-century essayists
21st-century essayists
20th-century Spanish male writers
21st-century Spanish male writers